Kröpfl is a German-language, Austrian surname. Notable people with this surname include:

 Francisco Kröpfl (born 1931), Argentinian composer 
 Mario Kröpfl (born 1989), Austrian footballer
 Mario Kröpfl (born 1991), Austrian footballer
 Christoph Kröpfl (born 1990), Austrian footballer